The 2016 All-Ireland Senior Hurling Championship was the 129th staging of the All-Ireland championship since its establishment by the Gaelic Athletic Association in 1887. It is the top tier of senior inter-county championship hurling.
			
The championship began on 1 May 2016 and ended on 4 September 2016.

Kilkenny were the defending champions. Kerry qualified for the competition for the first time since 2004

Tipperary won the title for the 27th time and for the first time since 2010, defeating Kilkenny in the final, 2–29 to 2–20.

Format

The All-Ireland Senior Hurling Championship is a double-elimination tournament based on the Leinster and Munster provincial championships. Fourteen teams take part.

Leinster and Munster Hurling Championships

Leinster Senior Hurling Championship

Seven Leinster counties compete. Galway and Kerry, though not in Leinster, also participate. The competition begins with a qualifier group consisting of the four weakest teams. Two teams from the qualifier group progress and the remainder of the competition is knock-out. Most of the beaten teams enter the All-Ireland qualifiers – the two bottom teams in the Leinster qualifier group do not.

In 2016 the bottom team in the Leinster qualifier group will be relegated to next year's Christy Ring Cup (2nd tier). Their place in next year's Leinster qualifier group will be taken by the winner of 2016's Christy Ring Cup.

Kerry qualified for this year's Leinster Championship by winning the 2015 Christy Ring Cup.

Munster Senior Hurling Championship

Five Munster counties compete. Kerry participates in The Leinster Hurling Championship (see above). The competition has a knock-out format. All of the beaten teams enter the All-Ireland qualifiers.

Qualifiers

All teams beaten in the quarter-finals and semi-finals of the Leinster and Munster Hurling Championships enter the All-Ireland hurling qualifiers which are knock-out. The qualifiers eventually result in two teams who play the beaten finalists of the Leinster and Munster championships in the two All-Ireland quarter-finals.

All-Ireland

The Leinster and Munster champions play the winners of the two quarter finals in the semi-finals. The final normally takes place on the first Sunday in September.

Non-participating Provincial Championships

Connacht and Ulster teams can qualify for the All-Ireland Senior Hurling Championship by winning the Christy Ring Cup (tier 2).

Connacht Senior Hurling Championship

This competition is no longer organised. Galway represent Connacht and participate in the Leinster Championship.

Ulster Senior Hurling Championship

Although this competition takes place, it is not part of the All-Ireland Senior Hurling Championship. Currently no Ulster teams qualify for the All-Ireland Senior Hurling Championship.

Summary

Championships

Other Championship Tiers

Changes from 2015 championship

Hawkeye was used for the first time in the Munster Hurling Championship in Thurles when Tipperary played Cork on 22 May 2016. Previously it was only installed in Croke Park.

Broadcasting
Matches will be broadcast live on television in Ireland on RTÉ and Sky Sports, and in the United Kingdom on Sky Sports. Worldwide coverage will be provided on GAAGO.

RTÉ coverage will be shown on RTÉ One on The Sunday Game Live presented by Michael Lyster in high definition. Des Cahill will present The Sunday Game highlights and analysis show on Sunday evening.

These matches were broadcast live on television in Ireland

Provincial championships

Leinster Senior Hurling Championship

Leinster Format

Nine counties compete - seven from Leinster plus Galway and Kerry. Last year's Leinster champions receive a bye into the semi-final. The championship begins with a qualifier group involving the four weakest teams. The group winners and runners-up join four of the five strongest teams in the three Leinster quarter finals.

Leinster Qualifier Group

Leinster Qualifier Group Table

Leinster Qualifier Group Round 1

Leinster Qualifier Group Round 2

Leinster Qualifier Group Round 3

Leinster Senior Hurling Championship

Leinster Quarter-finals 

Last year's Leinster champions receive a bye into the semi-finals. The remaining six teams (four seeded teams plus the qualifier group winners and runners-up) play in three quarter-finals. An informal system of promotion or relegation operates in this round; if a team from the qualifier group wins their quarter-final, they will be seeded in next year's Leinster championship and the beaten seeded team will compete in next year's Leinster qualifier group.

Leinster Semi-finals 

Last year's Leinster champions receive a bye into the semi-finals. They are joined by the winners of the three quarter-finals.

Leinster final

Munster Senior Hurling Championship

Munster Format

Five of the six Munster counties compete. Kerry qualify for the qualifier group of the Leinster championship. The competition is straight knock-out.

Munster Quarter-final

Munster Semi-finals

Munster final

All-Ireland Senior Hurling Championship qualifiers
All qualifier matches are knock-out.

Qualifiers Round 1

Qualifiers Round 1 Format

The eight teams beaten in the quarter-finals and semi-finals of the Leinster (5 teams) and Munster (3 teams) provincial championships play in four matches.	
A draw is made that ensures there are three matches between Leinster and Munster teams and one match between two Leinster teams.

Qualifiers Round 1 Matches

Qualifiers Round 2

Qualifiers Round 2 Format

The four winners of round 1 play in two matches. The draw was made on 4 July.	
Teams who have already met in the Leinster or Munster championships cannot be drawn to meet again.

Qualifiers Round 2 Matches

All-Ireland Senior Hurling Championship

All-Ireland Quarter-finals

The beaten finalists from the Leinster and Munster championships play the winners of round 2 of the qualifiers.

All-Ireland Semi-finals

The Leinster and Munster champions play the winners of the two quarter-finals.

All-Ireland final

Statistics

Top scorer overall

Top scorer in a single game

Clean sheets

Scoring

Widest winning margin: 35 points
 Clare 5-32 – 0-12  Laois (Qualifier round 1)
Most goals in a match:  5
 Clare 5-32 – 0-12  Laois (Qualifier round 1)
 Offaly 3-22 – 2-14  Laois (Leinster quarter-final)
 Tipperary 5-19 – 0-13  Waterford (Munster Final)
Most points in a match: 49
 Cork 1-26 – 1-23  Dublin (Qualifier round 1)
 Tipperary 2-29 – 2-20  Kilkenny (All-Ireland Final)
Most goals by one team in a match: 5
 Clare 5-32 – 0-12  Laois (Qualifier round 1)
 Tipperary 5-19 – 0-13  Waterford (Munster Final)
Highest aggregate score: 61
 Tipperary 2-29 – 2-20  Kilkenny (All-Ireland Final)
Lowest aggregate score:  34
 Clare 0-19 – 0-15  Limerick (Qualifier Round 2)
Most goals scored by a losing team: 2
 Offaly	1-17 – 2-11  Carlow (Leinster round robin)
 Westmeath 0-22 – 2-15  Carlow (Leinster round robin)
 Tipperary 2-29 – 2-20  Kilkenny (All-Ireland Final)

Miscellaneous

 Kerry are the first team from Munster to play in the Leinster Championship and was their first in the senior championship since 2004. Their round 3 qualifier group match against Offaly on 22 May was the first ever championship meeting between the two teams.	
 On 1 May 2016 Westmeath defeated Offaly in the championship for the first time since 1976. Their opening Leinster qualifier group game was also their first championship meeting since then.
 The draw between Kilkenny and Waterford on 7 August was the first time a replay was required to decide an All-Ireland semi-final since 2003, when Wexford an Cork played out a 3–17 to 2–20 tie.
Tipperary's defeat of Waterford by 21 points in the Munster final is the biggest Munster final win since 1972.
Tipperary's victory in the All-Ireland marks their second title of the 2010s, making it the first decade since the 1960s in which the county has won multiple All-Ireland titles, having only won one title each in the 1970s, 1980s, 1990s and 2000s.

Teams

Overview

All bar one of the teams from the 2015 championship participated in hurling's top tier in 2016.

Antrim, who finished bottom of the 2015 Leinster qualifier group, were relegated to the 2016 Christy Ring Cup. Their place in the 2016 Leinster qualifier group went to Kerry who won the 2015 Christy Ring Cup and gained automatic promotion. It was the first time since 2004 that Kerry participated in the All-Ireland senior championship.

List of teams

Referees 

Sean Cleere -  Kilkenny

Brian Gavin -  Offaly

Fergal Horgan -  Tipperary

John Keenan -  Wicklow

Alan Kelly -  Galway

Barry Kelly -  Westmeath

Diarmuid Kirwan -  Cork

Colm Lyons -  Cork

James McGrath -  Westmeath

Paud O'Dwyer -  Carlow

James Owens -  Wexford

Johnny Ryan -  Tipperary

Attendances

Highest attendances:

 Tipperary 2-29 – 2-20  Kilkenny (Croke Park) - 82,016
 Tipperary 2-19 – 2-18  Galway (Croke Park) - 54,227
 Kilkenny 1-21 – 0-24  Waterford (Croke Park) - 34,432
 Galway 2-17 – 0-17  Clare (Semple Stadium) - 31,690
 Waterford 0-21 – 0-11  Wexford (Semple Stadium) - 31,690
 Kilkenny 2-19 – 2-17  Waterford (Semple Stadium) - 30,358
 Kilkenny 1-26 – 0-22  Galway (Croke Park) - 29,377
 Tipperary 0-22 – 0-13  Cork (Semple Stadium) - 29,114
 Tipperary 5-19 – 0-13  Waterford (Gaelic Grounds) - 26,508
 Tipperary 3-12 – 1-16  Limerick (Semple Stadium) - 25,531
 Clare 0-17 – 1-21  Waterford (Semple Stadium) - 19,715
 Cork 1-17 – 0-23  Wexford (Semple Stadium) - 15,540
 Clare 0-19 – 0-15  Limerick (Semple Stadium) - 15,540
 Dublin 2-19 – 0-12  Wexford (Croke Park) - 13,066
 Dublin 0-16 – 1-25  Kilkenny (O' Moore Park) - 10,419
 Cork 1-26 – 1-23  Dublin (Páirc Uí Rinn) - 10,058

Total attendance: 486,553Average attendance: 24,328

Awards
Sunday Game Team of the Year
The Sunday Game team of the year was picked on 4 September, which was the night of the final. The panel consisting of Brendan Cummins, Henry Shefflin, Michael Duignan, Ger Loughnane, Liam Sheedy, Eddie Brennan and Cyril Farrell selected Tipperary's Séamus Callanan as the Sunday game player of the year. Other players nominated were Padraic Maher and John McGrath of Tipperary.		
		
Eoin Murphy (Kilkenny)
Cathal Barrett (Tipperary)
James Barry (Tipperary)
Daithí Burke (Galway)
Padraig Walsh (Kilkenny)
Ronan Maher (Tipperary)
Padraic Maher (Tipperary)
Jamie Barron (Waterford)
David Burke (Galway)
Walter Walsh (Kilkenny)
Austin Gleeson (Waterford)
Patrick Maher (Tipperary)
Richie Hogan (Kilkenny)
Seamus Callanan (Tipperary)
John McGrath (Tipperary)

All Star Team of the Year
On 4 November, the 2016 All Star Award winners were announced at the awards ceremony in the National Convention Centre in Dublin.
Austin Gleeson of Waterford was named as the All Stars Hurler of the Year and the All Stars Young Hurler of the Year.

Eoin Murphy (Kilkenny)
Cathal Barrett (Tipperary)
James Barry (Tipperary)
Daithí Burke (Galway)
Padraig Walsh (Kilkenny)
Ronan Maher (Tipperary)
Padraic Maher (Tipperary)
Jamie Barron (Waterford)
David Burke (Galway)
Walter Walsh (Kilkenny)
Austin Gleeson (Waterford)
Patrick Maher (Tipperary)
Richie Hogan (Kilkenny)
Seamus Callanan (Tipperary)
John McGrath (Tipperary)

References

2016 in hurling